Spottail barb (Enteromius afrovernayi) is a species of ray-finned fish in the genus Enteromius. It has a wide distribution in western central Africa and is found from the Democratic Republic of Congo south through Angola, Zambia northern Namibia, Botswana and Zimbabwe.

The fish is named in honor of Arthur S. Vernay (1877–1960), an art and antiques dealer, who as a big game hunter and naturalist-explorer, funded and led an American Museum of Natural History expedition to the African country of Angola.

Footnotes 

Enteromius
Cyprinid fish of Africa
Taxa named by John Treadwell Nichols
Taxa named by Rudyerd Boulton
Fish described in 1927